Addy-Spencer House located at 919–20 St. James Street in the Shadyside neighborhood of Pittsburgh, Pennsylvania, was built in 1869.  It was added to the List of Pittsburgh History and Landmarks Foundation Historic Landmarks in 2000.

References

Houses in Pittsburgh
Houses completed in 1869
1869 establishments in Pennsylvania
Pittsburgh History & Landmarks Foundation Historic Landmarks